Heitianpu is a town in Shaodong, Hunan, China. It borders Chenjiafang Town and Taizhimiao Township of Xinshao County in the north, Lianqiao Town in the east, Huangpiqiao Township, Dahetang Subdistrict and Songjiatang Subdistrict in south, and Niumasi Town in the west.

History
In 1950 it was known as "Baoshan Township". In 1958 its name was changed to "Heitianpu People's Commune". It was restored as a township in 1984.

Administrative division
As of 2017, the town is divided into 50 villages.

Economy
The main industries in and around the town is wood processing. Pig production is an important source of meat for rural communities and of income. Other sources of income include Chinese herbal medicine.

Tourism
Zidong Academy was built in 1827 by Shen Dengwu, it was burned by the Japanese army in the Second Sino-Japanese War.

Kangfu Pavilion was built in 1786 during the reign of Qianlong Emperor of the Qing dynasty (1644–1911) and has been designated as municipal cultural relic preservation organ by the Government of Shaoyang in 2011.

Notable people
, revolutionist.

, lieutenant general of the People's Liberation Army.

, lieutenant general of the National Revolutionary Army.

References

Divisions of Shaodong